Kane Williamson is an international cricketer who represents the New Zealand national cricket team. , he is the captain of the team in One Day International (ODI) and Twenty20 International (T20I) cricket. A right handed top order batsman, he has scored 41 centuries28 in Tests and 13 in ODIs, which is the most scored by a New Zealand cricketer . In January 2015, former New Zealand cricketer Martin Crowe noted that, "we're seeing the dawn of probably our greatest ever batsman" in Williamson.

Williamson made his ODI debut against India in August 2010 and scored his first century two months later when he made 108 against Bangladesh; New Zealand lost the match by nine runs. His 69-ball 100 not outmade against Zimbabwe in October 2011is the fourth fastest ODI century by a New Zealander. His highest score of 148 came against the West Indies in the 2019 World Cup.

Williamson scored a century on his debut Test match against India in November 2010; he was the eighth New Zealander to achieve this feat. His highest score of 251 was made against West Indies at Seddon Park, Hamilton in December 2020. He became the sixth player to score 10 Test centuries before the age of 25 when he made 132 against England at Lord's. In August 2016, he became the fastest and youngest player to score centuries against all Test-playing nations in the format at the time. In December 2022, in the first Test against Pakistan, he scored his fifth double century in Tests, and became the first New Zealand batter to hit five double centuries in Test cricket. , he has the most Test centuries and double centuries for New Zealand. 

Williamson has played 87 T20Is since his debut in October 2011 and is yet to score a century in the format; his highest score of 95 was made against India in January 2020.

Key 
 *  Remained not out
   Captain of New Zealand in that match
   Man of the match
 (D/L)  Result was determined by the Duckworth–Lewis method

Test centuries

One Day International centuries

Notes

References 

Williamson
Williamson, Kane